The 2007 E3 Prijs Vlaanderen was the 50th edition of the E3 Harelbeke cycle race and was held on 31 March 2007. The race started and finished in Harelbeke. The race was won by Tom Boonen of the Quick-Step team. Suffering from hand cramps, he wasn't able to raise his hands when arriving.

General classification

References

2007 in Belgian sport
2007